Events in the year 1908 in Bulgaria.

Incumbents

Events 

 25 May – The Democratic Party won 166 of the 203 seats in the parliament following parliamentary elections. Voter turnout was 50.2%.

References 

 
1900s in Bulgaria
Years of the 20th century in Bulgaria
Bulgaria
Bulgaria